Tazzoli may refer to:

Enrico Tazzoli (priest), an Italian priest who was one of the Belfiore martyrs
Italian submarine Enrico Tazzoli, more than one submarine of the Italian Navy